Nils Börge Gårdh, born 20 February 1946 in Stockholm, Sweden is a Swedish Christian singer and businessman. His major solo hit, Jag längtar bort, charted at the top 10-chart Svensktoppen for 10 weeks in 1982. He also works for the Hoppets stjärna charity organization.

Discography

Albums
1975 – En sång om glädje
1976 – Kärleken från dej
1978 – En julhälsning från Nils-Börge Gårdh
1983 – I herrens händer
2001 – Jul, jul strålande jul

Singles
2006 – Barndomsåren/Där sången aldrig tystnar

References

1946 births
Living people
Swedish country singers
Swedish gospel singers